Emmanuel Portacio (11 December 1969 – 7 April 2022) was a Filipino international lawn bowler.

Bowls career
In 2017, Portacio won the gold medal in the fours event at the 2017 Southeast Asian Games in Kuala Lumpur.

References

1969 births
2022 deaths
Filipino male lawn bowls players
Southeast Asian Games medalists in lawn bowls
Competitors at the 2007 Southeast Asian Games
Competitors at the 2017 Southeast Asian Games
Competitors at the 2019 Southeast Asian Games
Southeast Asian Games gold medalists for the Philippines
Southeast Asian Games bronze medalists for the Philippines